Trenton Township may refer to:

Trenton Township, Henry County, Iowa
Trenton Township, Edwards County, Kansas
Trenton Township, Grundy County, Missouri
Trenton Township, New Jersey, historical, now mostly in Trenton city
Trenton Township, Williams County, North Dakota; see Williams County, North Dakota
Trenton Township, Delaware County, Ohio
Trenton Township, Brookings County, South Dakota; see Brookings County, South Dakota

See also
Trenton (disambiguation)

Township name disambiguation pages